The following low-power television stations broadcast on digital or analog channel 12 in the United States:

 K12AK-D in Crested Butte, Colorado
 K12AL-D in Waunita Hot Springs, Colorado
 K12AV-D in Pateros/Mansfield, Washington
 K12BA-D in Winthrop-Twisp, Washington
 K12BE-D in Orondo, etc., Washington
 K12CV-D in Riverside, Washington
 K12CW-D in Malott/Wakefield, Washington
 K12CX-D in Tonasket, Washington
 K12DE-D in Lund & Preston, Nevada
 K12FB-D in Saco, Montana
 K12GP-D in Dodson, Montana
 K12JJ-D in Benbow, etc., California
 K12LA-D in Kenai, etc., Alaska
 K12LF-D in Coolin, Idaho
 K12LI-D in Thayne, etc., Wyoming
 K12LO-D in Ferndale, Montana
 K12LS-D in Challis, Idaho
 K12LU-D in West Glacier, etc., Montana
 K12LV-D in Dryden, Washington
 K12LX-D in Powderhorn, Colorado
 K12MD-D in Sleetmute, Alaska
 K12MI-D in Laketown, etc., Utah
 K12MM-D in Girdwood Valley, Alaska
 K12MS-D in Elko, Nevada
 K12MW-D in Manhattan, Nevada
 K12NH-D in Hobbs, New Mexico
 K12OC-D in Red River, New Mexico
 K12OF-D in Bullhead City, Arizona
 K12OG-D in Taos, New Mexico
 K12PT-D in Ryndon, Nevada
 K12QH-D in Dolores, Colorado
 K12QM-D in Thomasville, Colorado
 K12QO-D in Aspen, Colorado
 K12QQ-D in Cedar City, Utah
 K12QS-D in Mink Creek, Idaho
 K12QT-D in Trout Creek, etc., Montana
 K12QW-D in Silver City, New Mexico
 K12QY-D in Leamington, Utah
 K12RA-D in Colstrip, Montana
 K12RD-D in Coulee City, Washington
 K12RE-D in Denton, Montana
 K12RF-D in Healy, etc., Alaska
 K12XA-D in Abilene, Texas
 K12XC-D in Salina & Redmond, Utah
 K12XD-D in Aurora, etc., Utah
 K12XE-D in Woodland, Utah
 K12XG-D in Roosevelt, Utah
 K12XH-D in Price, Utah
 K12XI-D in Helper, Utah
 K12XJ-D in Modesto, California
 K12XK-D in Denver, Colorado
 K12XO-D in Midland/Odessa, Texas
 K12XP-D in Phoenix, Arizona
 K12XQ-D in Monroe, Louisiana
 K44FU-D in Long Valley Junction, Utah
 KJJM-LD in Dallas & Mesquite, Texas
 KJKZ-LP in Fresno, California
 KJOU-LD in Bakersfield, California
 KRJR-LD in Sacramento, California
 KSVC-LD in Marysvale, Utah
 KUSE-LD in Seattle, Washington
 KVGA-LD in Las Vegas, Nevada
 KYAV-LD in Palm Springs, California
 W12AQ-D in Black Mountain, North Carolina
 W12AR-D in Waynesville, etc., North Carolina
 W12CI-D in Hot Springs, North Carolina
 W12DI-D in Key West, Florida
 WBPA-LD in Pittsburgh, Pennsylvania
 WBQP-CD in Pensacola, Florida
 WCQA-LD in Springfield, Illinois
 WDNV-LD in Atlanta, Georgia
 WGBS-LD in Carrollton, Virginia
 WHDC-LD in Charleston, South Carolina
 WMBQ-CD in New York, New York, uses WNET's full-power spectrum
 WNDT-CD in Manhattan, New York, uses WNET'S full-power spectrum
 WPRQ-LD in Clarksdale, Mississippi
 WSOC-CR in Shelby, North Carolina
 WSOC-TV (DRT) in Statesville, North Carolina
 WWDG-CD in Rome, New York

The following low-power stations, which are no longer licensed, formerly broadcast on digital or analog channel 12:
 K12AA-D in Troy, Montana
 K12AH in Big Piney, etc., Wyoming
 K12AZ in Spring Glen, etc., Utah
 K12BF-D in Ardenvoir, Washington
 K12BK in Worland, Wyoming
 K12CD in Kanarraville, Utah
 K12CE in Scofield, Utah
 K12CT in Koosharem, Utah
 K12DL in Duchesne, etc., Utah
 K12DV in Potter Valley, California
 K12FG in Roosevelt, etc., Utah
 K12FY in Big Laramie, etc., Wyoming
 K12GI in Morgan, etc., Utah
 K12HY in Beowawe, Nevada
 K12IT in Smith, Nevada
 K12IX in Austin, Nevada
 K12JI in Newberry Springs, California
 K12JM in Peoa/Oakley, Utah
 K12KZ in Fruitland, Utah
 K12LC in Wanship, Utah
 K12LR in Forsyth, Montana
 K12MJ in Riverton, etc., Wyoming
 K12MO in Copper Center, Alaska
 K12ND in Kanab, Utah
 K12NO in Sheep Mountain, Alaska
 K12NP in Atmautluak, Alaska
 K12NR in Kake, Alaska
 K12NS in Akiak, Alaska
 K12NW in Halibut Cove, Alaska
 K12NZ in Idaho Falls, Idaho
 K12OR in Mesa, Colorado
 K12OV-D in Shelter Cove, California
 K12QV in San Bernardino, California
 K12QZ-D in San Luis Obispo, California
 KWSJ-LP in Snowflake, Arizona
 KWVG-LD in Malaga, etc., Washington
 W12AU in Burnsville, North Carolina
 W12BJ in Owensboro, Kentucky
 WRMX-LP in Nashville, Tennessee
 WZPC-LP in Panama City, Florida

References

12 low-power